The 1944–45 Kansas Jayhawks men's basketball team represented the University of Kansas during the 1944–45 college men's basketball season.

Roster
Norman Carlson
Herbert Helm
Gordon Reynolds
Owen Peck
Dean Corder
Charles Moffett
Kirk Scott
Louis Goehring
Gustave Daum
Edgar Williams
Everett Hill

Schedule

References

Kansas Jayhawks men's basketball seasons
Kansas
Kansas
Kansas